Sizzle is an album by American jazz saxophonist Sam Rivers featuring performances recorded in 1975 and released on the Impulse! label.

Reception 
The Allmusic review by Michael G. Nastos awarded the album 2 stars stating "Funky with electric touches. Fierce".

Track listing 
All compositions by Sam Rivers
 "Dawn" - 12:38
 "Flare" - 8:53
 "Flame" - 12:20
 "Scud" - 9:59
Recorded at Generation Sound Studios in New York City on December 9, 1975

Personnel 
 Sam Rivers - soprano saxophone, tenor saxophone, flute, piano
Ted Dunbar - guitar
Dave Holland - bass, cello
Barry Altschul -  drums
Warren Smith - drums, vibes, tympani

References 

Impulse! Records albums
Sam Rivers (jazz musician) albums
1976 albums